The 1945 Kentucky Wildcats football team represented the University of Kentucky in the 1945 college football season. The team was led by first-year head coach Bernie Shively.

Schedule

References

Kentucky
Kentucky Wildcats football seasons
Kentucky Wildcats football